The Diversity Foundation, also known as Smiles for Diversity, is a nonprofit organization started by Dr. Dan Fischer, who was raised in the polygamous community of the Fundamentalist Church of Jesus Christ of Latter Day Saints and who is a former member of the FLDS church.

The Diversity Foundation is a registered 501(c)(3) organization. The organization attempts to empower vulnerable and underprivileged children with access to quality education. Through educational tools Diversity supports and encourages mindful awareness of the value of diversity and a respect of ethnic and cultural heritage.

After the attack on a Jewish day-care center in California and the murder of gay University of Wyoming student Matthew Shepard, Fischer set up The Diversity Foundation to encourage dentists to promote respect for human diversity.

Smiles for Diversity's primary method for encouraging acceptance of diversity is through the distribution of comic books and coloring books. Part of The Diversity Foundation's charitable mission is to provide educational materials without charge to teachers and librarians. The comic book is Scrapyard Detectives, created by Bill Galvan and Chad Denton, and was originally created as "a way for kids to get the message that being different is great, and diversity should be appreciated and celebrated".

The Diversity Foundation attempts to help Lost Boys of Polygamy by helping the boys get schooling and college educations. Fischer also wants to raise awareness about the Lost Boys.

References

External links 
 Scrapyard Detectives
 Official website

Charities based in Utah
Mormon fundamentalism
Dental organizations